The citron-bellied attila (Attila citriniventris) is a species of bird in the family Tyrannidae.

It is found in Brazil, Colombia, Ecuador, Peru, and Venezuela. Its natural habitat is subtropical or tropical moist lowland forests.

References

Attila (genus)
Birds described in 1859
Taxonomy articles created by Polbot